General elections were held in Liechtenstein between March and October 1877. The election was called following the dissolution of the Landtag due to a currency crisis in the country. The Landstag election that took place on 30 April was suspended and did not resume until 18 October.

Background 
From 1873 to 1876, the Austro-Hungarian florin, which was being used as legal tender in Liechtenstein since 1859, dropped in value by 10%. This created disadvantages in trade between Liechtenstein and Switzerland, especially for the Oberland region. However, the Unterland region did not see any visible losses as it mainly traded with the region of Vorarlberg in Austria.

In 1876, Liechtenstein gained monetary sovereignty in a renewed customs treaty with Austria. This was followed by Liechtenstein adopting the Swiss franc as legal tender on 23 December 1876 following demands in the country for a stable gold currency. The Unterland region opposed the adoption of the Swiss franc with region's four Landtag members resigning prior to the move.

In response, the Unterland region threatened in January 1877 to secede from Liechtenstein to join Austria if the Landtag is not dissolved and if the adoption of the Swiss franc is not annulled. The remaining Landtag members resigned on 15 January, with Prince Johann II dissolving the Landtag and suspending the adoption of the Swiss franc on 18 January.

Electors 
Electors were selected through elections that were held between 22 March and 14 April. Each municipality had two electors for every 100 inhabitants.

Results

April election 
The electors met on 30 April in Vaduz to elect twelve Landtag members and five substitute members. Of the 160 electors, 154 participated in the voting.

In the first ballot, eight out of twelve seats of the Landtag were already filled with all of the elected members being from the Oberland region. Electors from Unterland did not participate in the second ballot which resulted to the election being suspended due to a lack of quorum.

Markus Kessler and Ferdinand Walser declined their elections.

October election 
The election of the Landtag continued on 18 October after negotiations between the representatives of Oberland and Unterland. Of the 160 electors, 148 participated in the voting. The electors voted for the remaining six Landtag members and five substitute members.

The newly elected Landtag decided to dissolve with new elections scheduled in 1878 and to create the two electoral districts of Oberland and Unterland.

References 

Liechtenstein
1877 in Liechtenstein
Elections in Liechtenstein
April 1877 events
October 1877 events